Futsal is a football-based game played on a hard court like a basketball court, smaller than a football pitch, and mainly indoors. It has similarities to five-a-side football and indoor football.

Futsal is played between two teams of five players each, one of whom is the goalkeeper. Unlimited substitutions are permitted. Unlike some other forms of indoor soccer, it is played on a hard court surface marked by lines; walls or boards are not used. It is played with a smaller, harder, lower-bounce ball than football. The surface, ball and rules favour ball control and passing in small spaces. The game emphasizes control, improvisation, creativity and technique.

Naming
Futsal comes from the Portuguese futebol de salão and from the Spanish fútbol sala or fútbol de salón (all translatable as "indoor football"). During its second world championships held in Madrid in 1985, the Spanish name fútbol sala was used. The World Futsal Association registered the name futsal in 1985, following a dispute with FIFA over the name fútbol. Since then, futsal has become the officially and internationally accepted name, and FIFA has also started using the term.

History

Origins 
Futsal started in 1930 when Juan Carlos Ceriani, a teacher in Montevideo, Uruguay, created a version of indoor football for YMCAs.

Originally developed for basketball courts, a rule book for the new sport was published in September 1933. Association football was already highly popular in the country, and after Uruguay won the 1930 World Cup and gold medals in the 1924 and 1928 Summer Olympics, it attracted even more practitioners. Ceriani's goal was to create a team game similar to football that could be played indoors or outdoors.

While writing the rule book, Ceriani combined the principles of association football—where the ball may be touched with every part of the body except the hands—with rules from other sports: from basketball, the number of players (five per team) and the game's duration (40 active minutes); from water polo, the goalkeeping rules; and from team handball, the field and goal sizes.

The YMCA spread the game quickly throughout South America. It was easily played by everyone, everywhere, and in any weather condition, helping players of other sports stay in shape all year round. These reasons convinced João Lotufo, a Brazilian, to bring the game to his country and adapt it to the needs of physical education.

Initially, the rules were not uniform. In 1956, the rules were modified by Habib Maphuz and Luiz Gonzaga de Oliveira Fernandes within the YMCA of São Paulo, Brazil, to allow seniors to compete. Luiz de Oliveira wrote the Book of Rules of Futsal in 1956, then adopted also at the international level.

In 1965, the Confederación Sudamericana de Futsal (South American Futsal Confederation) was formed, consisting of Uruguay, Brazil, Paraguay, Peru and Argentina.

Shortly after, a tournament was organized. It attracted some interest in South American media, which regularly began to follow futsal. In particular, it was the Brazilian journalist José Antônio Inglêz who passionately contributed to the rapid spread of the game, as well as being credited as the man who coined the name "futsal".

The most attended futsal match in history was played on 7 September 2014 on Mane Garrincha Stadium in Brazil's capital Brasilia between Brazil and Argentina in front of 56,483 spectators.

Governing bodies 
The two most important governing bodies of futsal are the Asociación Mundial de Fútsal (AMF) and Fédération Internationale de Football Association (FIFA). AMF is the successor organization to the original governing body. FIFA later took an interest in futsal. However, talks between FIFA and AMF to reconcile governance were not successful. FIFA organizes its own separate competitions.

The International Futsal Alliance (IFA) is a partnership of countries formed to offer high quality futsal tournaments throughout the world. It sees itself as ancillary rather than competing with FIFA. Its membership spans countries from North and South America, Europe, Africa, Asia, and Oceania. Several tournaments have been organized under the auspices of IFA, including a world cup for men held in 2019 and one for women held in 2017.

Rules 

There are currently two governing bodies: Asociación Mundial de Fútsal (AMF) and Fédération Internationale de Football Association (FIFA) which are responsible for maintaining and regulating the official rules of their respective versions of futsal.

FIFA publishes its futsal rules as the 'Laws of the Game', in which each of the 17 'laws' is a thematically related collection of individual regulations. The laws define all aspects of the game, including which may be changed to suit local competitions and leagues.

Many of the laws are similar or identical to those found in association football, or reference association football in their absence (such as a section noting that there is no offside infraction in futsal). These rules are subjective and differ from tournament to tournament.

Summary of rules
Length of the field
minimum , maximum .
Ball
The ideal futsal ball should weigh 390–490 grams.
Time
There are two periods of 20 minutes with time stopping at every dead ball. Between the two periods there is a break of 15 minutes. Each team may use one time-out per half, which lasts one minute. Some leagues and tournaments use 25 minute periods with running time.
Number of players
There are five players for each team in the field, one of them as goalkeeper, and a maximum number of 12 players that can be used each match. Substitutions are unlimited and on-the-fly.
Fouls
All direct free kicks count as accumulated fouls. A direct free kick is awarded for kicking,  jumping, pushing, striking,holding, spitting, and deliberate handling. Indirect free kicks, such as playing dangerously and impeding, do not count as accumulated fouls. A team is warned by the referee when they commit five accumulated fouls in a half. All accumulated fouls after the warning result in a direct kick from the second penalty mark. 
Cards
A caution can be shown for unsporting behavior, dissent, failure to respect the distance on a restart, excessive delay of a restart, persistent infringement, or incorrectly entering/leaving the field of play. A player or substitute can be sent off for serious foul play, violent conduct, spitting, illegally denying an obvious goal-scoring opportunity, abusive language, and receiving a second caution. Sent-off players are ejected from the game and their team must play short for two minutes or until the other team scores a goal.
Free kicks
Taken from the spot of the infringement or on the line of the penalty area nearest the infringement (indirect only). The kick must be taken within four seconds or an indirect kick is awarded to the other team.
Kick from the second penalty mark
Awarded when a team commits 6 or more accumulated fouls in a half.
Penalty kick
 from the center of the goal for fouls inside the  goal keeper's area.
Goalkeeper
When in possession of the ball, the goalkeeper has 4 seconds to get rid of the ball. If the ball is kept too long, the referee will give an indirect kick to the other team. The goalkeeper may play freely when in the opponent's half.
Goalkeeper pass-back restriction
Once the goalkeeper has released the ball either by kicking or throwing, the goalkeeper may not touch it again until the ball goes out of play or is touched by an opponent. The sanction for violation is an indirect free kick. The goalkeeper may receive the ball freely when on the opponent's half.
Kick-in
A kick-in is used instead of a throw-in. The ball must be stationary and the kick-in must be taken within 4 seconds from the time the player is ready. During kick-in, opponents must stand at least  from the ball. If four seconds elapses or an illegal kick is taken, the referee will award a kick-in to the other team. It is not allowed to score directly from a kick-in: the goal is valid only if someone else touches the ball before it enters in goal.
Goal clearance
A goal clearance is used instead of a goal kick. The goalkeeper must throw the ball with their hands and it must leave the penalty area within four seconds. If goal clearance is taken illegally the goalkeeper may retry, but the referee will not reset the count. If four seconds elapses, the other team gets an indirect kick on the penalty area line.
Corner kick
The ball must be placed inside the arc nearest to the point where the ball crossed the goal line and the opponent must stand on field at least  from the corner arch until the ball is in play. The corner kick must be taken within 4 seconds of being ready or else a goal clearance will be awarded to the other team. The ball is in play when it is kicked and moves.
Referees
For international matches, there must be two referees: one (first referee) is positioned on the touchline near the timekeeper table and communicates with the timekeeper, while the other (second referee) is in the opposite side of the field. At the timekeeper table there is a timekeeper and a third referee, who controls the teams' benches. In minor events, the third referees and the timekeeper are not used.

Players, equipment and officials 

There are five players on the field on each team, one of whom is the goalkeeper. The maximum number of substitutes allowed is nine (FIFA change 2012), with unlimited substitutions during the match. Substitutes can come on even when the ball is in play but the player coming off must leave the field before the substitute can enter the playing field. If a team has or is reduced to fewer than three players remaining, the match is abandoned and counted as a loss for the team with the lack of players.

The kit is made up of a jersey or shirt with sleeves, shorts, socks, shinguards made out of metal, plastic or foam, and shoes with rubber soles. The goalkeeper is allowed to wear long trousers and a different coloured kit to distinguish themself from the other players on the team and the referee. The goalkeeper is also allowed to wear elbow pads because the surface is about as hard as a tennis court or basketball court. Jewellery is not allowed, nor are other items that could be dangerous to the player wearing the item or to other active participants.

The match is controlled by the referee, who enforces the Laws of the Game, and the first referee is the only one who can legally abandon the match because of interference from outside the field. This referee is assisted by a second referee who typically watches over the goal lines or assists the primary referee with calls on fouls or plays. The decisions made by the referees are final and can only be changed if the referees think it is necessary and play has not restarted. There is also a third referee and a timekeeper who are provided with equipment to keep a record of fouls in the match. In the event of injury to the second referee, the third referee will replace the second referee.

The court 

The futsal court is made up of wood or artificial material, or similar surface, although any flat, smooth and non-abrasive material may be used. For other matches, it can be  in length, while the width can be , as long as the length of the longer boundary lines (touchlines) are greater than the shorter boundaries where the goals are placed (goal lines) (Basketball courts of  can be used).

A rectangular goal is positioned at the middle of each goal line. Nets made of hemp, jute or nylon are attached to the back of the goalposts and crossbar. The lower part of the nets is attached to curved tubing or another suitable means of support.

In front of each goal is an area known as the penalty area. This area is created by drawing quarter-circles with a  radius from the goal line, centered on the goalposts. The upper part of each quarter-circle is then joined by a  line running parallel to the goal line between the goalposts. The line marking the edge of the penalty area is known as the penalty area line. The penalty area marks where the goalkeeper is allowed to touch the ball with hands. The penalty mark is six metres from the goal line when it reaches the middle of the goalposts. A penalty kick from the penalty spot is awarded if a player commits a foul inside the penalty area. The second penalty spot is used if a player commits their team's sixth foul in the opposing team's half or in their own half in the area bordered by the halfway line and an imaginary line parallel to the halfway line passing through the second penalty mark; the free kick is taken from the second penalty mark.

Any standard team handball field can be used for futsal, including goals and floor markings.

Duration and tie-breaking methods 
A standard match consists of two equal periods of 20 minutes. The length of either half is extended to allow penalty kicks to be taken or a direct free kick to be taken against a team that has committed more than five fouls. The interval between the two halves cannot exceed 15 minutes.

In some competitions, the game cannot end in a draw, so away goals, extra time and kicks from the penalty mark are the three methods for determining the winner after a match has been drawn. Away goals mean that if the team's score is level after playing one home and one away game, the team which has scored more away goals wins. Extra time consists of two periods of five minutes. If no winner is produced after these methods, three kicks from the penalty mark are taken, and the team that has scored the most wins. If it is not decided after three kicks from the penalty mark, it continues to go on with one extra kick from the penalty mark to each team at a time until one of them has scored more goals than the other. Unlike extra time, the goals scored in a shoot-out do not count towards the goals scored throughout the match.

The start and restart of play 
At the beginning of the match, a coin toss is used to decide who will start the match. A kick-off is used to signal the start of play and is used at the start of the second half and any periods of extra time. It is also used after a goal has been scored, with the other team starting the play. After a temporary stoppage for any reason not mentioned in the Laws of the Game, the referee will drop the ball where the play was stopped, provided that, before the stoppage, the ball was in play and had not crossed either the touch lines or goal lines.

If the ball goes over the goal line or touchline, hits the ceiling, or the play is stopped by the referee, the ball is out of play. If it hits the ceiling of an indoor arena, play is restarted with a kick-in to the opponents of the team that last touched the ball, under the place where it hit the ceiling.

Lack of offside rule 
Unlike association football, there is no offside in futsal. Under the Futsal Laws of the Game, Law 11 references offside as it does in association football, but only says that there is no offside in futsal.

Misconduct 

A direct free kick can be awarded to the opposing team if a player succeeds or attempts to kick or trip an opponent, jumps, charges or pushes an opponent, or strikes or attempts to strike an opponent. Holding, touching or spitting at an opponent are offenses that are worthy of a direct free kick, as are sliding in to play the ball while an opponent is playing it or carrying, striking or throwing the ball (except the goalkeeper).

These are all accumulated fouls. After five accumulated fouls in a half, the sixth accumulated foul and beyond result in a direct kick from the penalty mark where members of both teams may not make a wall prior to the kick.

The direct free kick is taken where the infringement occurred, unless it is awarded to the defending team in their penalty area, in which case the free kick may be taken from anywhere inside the penalty area. A penalty kick is awarded if a player commits one of the fouls that are worthy of a direct free kick inside their own penalty area. The position of the ball does not matter as long as it is in play but for a penalty kick, the ball must be on the outer line, perpendicular to the center of the net.

An indirect free kick is awarded to the opposing team if a goalkeeper clears the ball but then touches it with their hands before anyone else, if the goalkeeper controls the ball with hands when it has been kicked to them by a teammate, or if they touch or control the ball with hands or feet in their own half for more than four seconds.

An indirect free kick is also awarded to the opposing team if a player plays in a dangerous manner, deliberately obstructs an opponent, prevents the goalkeeper from throwing the ball with hands or anything else for which play is stopped to caution or dismiss a player. The indirect free kick is taken from the place where the infringement occurred.

Yellow and red cards are used in futsal. The yellow card is to caution players over their actions. If they get two, they are given a red card, which means they are sent off the field. A yellow card is shown if a player shows unsporting behavior, dissent, persistent infringement of the Laws of the Game, delaying the restart of play, failing to respect the distance of the player from the ball when play is being restarted, infringement of substitution procedure or entering, re-entering and leaving the field without the referee's permission. A player is shown the red card and sent off if they engage in serious foul play, violent conduct, spitting at another person, or denying the opposing team a goal by handling the ball (except the goalkeeper inside their penalty area). Also punishable with a red card is denying an opponent moving towards the player's goal a goal scoring opportunity by committing an offense punishable by a free kick or a penalty kick and using offensive, insulting or abusive language or gestures. A player who has been sent off must leave the vicinity of the field.

A substitute player is permitted to come on two minutes after a teammate has been sent off, unless a goal is scored before the end of the two minutes. If a team with more players scores against a team with fewer players, another player can be added to the team with an inferior number of players. If the teams are equal when the goal is scored or if the team with fewer players scores, both teams remain with the same number of players.

World ranking

Men 
There is currently no official futsal ranking., the top 25 teams according to one Elo-based ranking system are:

 Calculate function  

where:
 POld: team's point before the match
 n : the importance coefficient
 60 for World Cup finals;
 50 for continental championship finals and major intercontinental tournaments;
 40 for World Cup and continental qualifiers and major tournaments;
 30 for all other tournaments;
 20 for friendly matches.
 r: Result of the match
 1 for a winning.
 0.5 for a drawing.
 0 for a losing.
 re : the expected result of the match:

where dR is the difference between two teams' ratings before the game.

Women 
, according to a ranking based partly on the Elo system, the top 10 teams are:

Competitions

National team competitions

Men

Women

Club competitions

Discontinued competitions 
 Futsal at the Pan American Games
 Futsal at the Lusophony Games

FIFA competitions

Men

International

Continental (major)

World University Futsal Championships

Men's

Women's

 A round-robin tournament determined the final standings.

China International Futsal Tournament 
CFA Futsal International Tournaments - Changshu Story

 A round-robin tournament determined the final standings.

Hangzhou International Futsal Tournament Story

 A round-robin tournament determined the final standings.

Tiger's Cup/World 5's Futsal

 A round-robin tournament determined the final standings.

Clubs 
 Intercontinental Futsal Cup
 UEFA Futsal Champions League
 Copa Libertadores de Futsal
 AFC Futsal Club Championship
 AFF Futsal Club Championship
 CONCACAF Futsal Club Championship

Discontinued tournaments 
 Pan American Games
 Lusophony Games

Women

International

Continental

NSDF (National Sports Development Fund)

Men
2010 Thailand Five's
2016 Thailand Five's
2017 Thailand Five's
2018 Thailand Five's http://futsalplanet.com/news.aspx?id=233 / http://www.futsalplanet.com/news.aspx?id=192
2020:http://www.futsalplanet.com/news.aspx?id=418 SAT (Sports Authority of Thailand (SAT)) International Futsal Championship (Iran B)
2021:http://www.futsalplanet.com/news.aspx?id=589 Continental Futsal Championship
2022:http://www.futsalplanet.com/news.aspx?id=784 NSDF Futsal Invitation Championship (Iran U-19)
2022:http://www.futsalplanet.com/news.aspx?id=816&pa=4 Continental Futsal Championship
2023:http://www.futsalplanet.com/news.aspx?id=863 NSDF Futsal Invitation Championship

2022 European Universities Games : http://www.futsalplanet.com/news.aspx?id=815&pa=4

Women
2022:http://www.futsalplanet.com/news.aspx?id=791

Deaf

U21
1st DIFA World Deaf Futsal U-21 Championships 2022 in Malaysia (Men and Women).

Senior
http://www.ciss.org/events/397

5th World Deaf Futsal Championships November 2023 Sao Paolo, Brazil (Men and Women).

Asia Pacific
3rd Men and 1st Women Asia Pacific Deaf Futsal Championships 15-24 February 2019 in Bangkok, Thailand. 

4th Men and 2nd Women 2023 in Iran.

Europe
https://www.edso.eu/category/news-sports/sports/summer-sports/futsal/

https://www.edso.eu/tag/futsal/

FIFUSA/AMF competitions

Men's national teams

International

Continental (major)

Women's national teams

International

Continental

See also 
 Futsal in Australia
 Futsal in Brazil
 Futsal in England
 Futsal in Iran
 Futsal in Italy
 Futsal in Libya
 Futsal in Norway
 Futsal in Portugal
 Futsal in Spain
 Futsal in Sweden
 Beach soccer
 Street football
 Olympic sports
 Asian Premier Futsal Championship
 Teqball
 Jorkyball

References

External links 

 
Association football terminology
Association football variants
Athletic sports
Ball games
Games and sports introduced in 1930
Team sports
Indoor sports
Sports originating in Brazil
Sports originating in Uruguay